The embassy of Argentina in Peru represents the permanent diplomatic mission of the South American country in Peru.

The current Argentine ambassador is Enrique Vaca-Narvaja.

History
The palace was built on land donated in 1921 by the government of Peru on the occasion of the Centennial of the Independence of Peru. In response, the Argentine government donated the premises currently occupied by the Embassy of Peru in Buenos Aires, the work of the Argentine architect Alejandro Bustillo.

The Palace was designed in a neo-colonial style by the Argentine architect  in 1929 and built by the Construction Engineer Gonzalo Panizo, being inaugurated in 1938 by the then Minister of Foreign Affairs of Peru, Carlos Concha, and the then Argentine Ambassador, Ricardo Colombres Mármol. From its inauguration and until 2012, it served both as the headquarters of the Embassy offices, as well as the residence of the Ambassador.

Due to its architectural and historical value, in October 2019 the building was declared an "Integrated Monument of the Cultural Heritage of the Nation" by the Ministry of Culture of Peru.

See also
Argentina–Peru relations
List of ambassadors of Peru to Argentina

References

Argentina
Peru
Argentina–Peru relations